The Rue d'Abbeville is a street in the 9th and 10th arrondissements of Paris. It derives its name from the proximity of the Gare du Nord (North Station) that serves the town of Abbeville, in Picardy in the Somme.

The street has two sections: 
 The first section, between the Place Franz-Liszt and the Rue de Rocroy, opened because of an ordinance dated 31 January 1827.  It was officially named Route d'Abbeville in 1847.
 The second section, between the Rue de Rocroy and the Rue de Maubeuge was opened because of an ordinance dated 3 August 1861, except for the portion between Rue de Rocroy and the Rue du Faubourg Poissonnière that opened in 1894.

The street adopted its present name in compliance with a decree of 28 December 1894.

Metro stations

The Rue d'Abbeville is:
 It is served by lines 4, 5, and 7.

External links

Abbeville
Abbeville